The Meeting Street Inn, is in the Charleston Historic District at 174 Meeting Street in downtown Charleston, South Carolina. The building is unusual in its history that dates to 1837 when it was occupied by the Charleston Theatre. In 1874, businessman Enoch Pratt bought the property and built a three-story brick building. It was built in the traditional Charleston style, and had running water piped throughout the building, an innovation for that time. The building turned into the Meeting Street Inn in 1981. The property was acquired by innkeeper Frances F. Limehouse in 1992, who made extensive renovations to develop the Inn as a luxury hotel. The renovations helped to bring in a modern restoration movement that transformed Charleston into a popular tourist destination.

History

In December 1837, the Charleston Theatre occupied the two-story building at 174 Meeting Street in downtown Charleston, South Carolina. The building was designed to resemble Karl Friedrich Schinkel's Royal Theatre of Berlin, Germany. The building was destroyed in the widespread Charleston fire of 1861. After the American Civil War, the property laid in ruins for fourteen years. In 1874, businessman Enoch Pratt bought the peroperty and built a three-story brick building with hardwood floors. It was built in the traditional Charleston single-home  Colonial style with running water piped throughout the building, an innovation at the time. Pratt divided the property into four lots, and sold two lots to Adolph Tiefenthal, a German immigrant. Tiefenthal hired D. A. J. Sullivan to build a restaurant and saloon, and a showroom for German beers and German wines on the ground floor. The second and third floors housed for the owner and his family.

Tiefenthal died in 1878. His wife remarried to Francois Obdenbeeck Jr., who took over running the saloon. In 1886, they closed their business and leased the property to the Atlantic Brewing and Ice company. In ca. 1900, George Homickel bought the lease and opened a club and restaurant. In 1903, the Tiefenthal estate sold the building to William J. O'Hogan, who operated it as Genuine Antiques for thirty-eight years.

Since then, different businesses occupied the premises, including the Savory Club and Restaurant, Genuine Antiques, Inc., an auto parts store, dental equipment supplier, liquor store, and bicycle shop. In 1981–1982, the property was renovated and enlarged and became the Meeting Street Inn, at a cost of $2.5 million. The new addition was built next to the six hotel rooms that were in the original building.

In 1987, the Lexington Group Properties VIII purchased the inn for $3.6 million from Meeting Street Inn Limited Partnership, which was controlled by Franklin G. Gay Jr. After falling into disrepair from Hurricane Hugo in 1989, the property was acquired by Innkeeper Frances "Frankie" F. Limehouse in 1992, who undertook extensive renovations to develop the Inn as a luxury hotel. He had already restored Charleston's Indigo Inn and Jasmine House. The renovations help to bring the modern restoration movement that has transformed Charleston into a popular tourist destination.

See also
 List of hotels in the United States
 National Register of Historic Places listings in Charleston, South Carolina

References

External links

 

Buildings and structures in Charleston, South Carolina
Hotel buildings completed in 1981
Hotels established in 1981
1837 establishments in South Carolina